How to Name It? (1986) is an instrumental Indian-Western fusion album by Ilaiyaraaja. This was Ilayaraaja's first fusion music album. The album has musical movements that are dedicated to Tyagaraja, a religious musician and composer from South India (1767-1847) and the Western baroque music composer, J. S. Bach (1685-1750) of Germany.

One of the tracks is based on Preludium in E by Johann Sebastian Bach.

Track listing
"How to Name It?" (7:22)
"Mad Mod Mood Fugue" (2:01)
"You Cannot Be Free" (5:31)
"Study for Violin" (1:38)
"It Is Fixed" (5:04)
"Chamber Welcomes Thiyagaraja" (5:49)
"I Met Bach in My House" (7:16)
"And We Had a Talk" (1:34)
"Don't Compare" (8:08)
"Do Anything" (5:21)

References

External links

1986 albums
Ilaiyaraaja albums